Sierra or ATS-2 is a supercomputer built for the Lawrence Livermore National Laboratory for use by the National Nuclear Security Administration as the second Advanced Technology System. It is primarily used for predictive applications in stockpile stewardship, helping to assure the safety, reliability and effectiveness of the United States' nuclear weapons.

Sierra is very similar in architecture to the Summit supercomputer built for the Oak Ridge National Laboratory. The Sierra system uses IBM POWER9 CPUs in conjunction with Nvidia Tesla V100 GPUs. The nodes in Sierra are Witherspoon IBM S922LC OpenPOWER servers with two GPUs per CPU and four GPUs per node. These nodes are connected with EDR InfiniBand. In 2019 Sierra was upgraded with IBM Power System AC922 nodes.

Sierra has consistently appeared on the Top500 list, peaking at #2 in November 2018.

See also 
 Trinity (supercomputer) – ATS-1, the first Advanced Technology System
 OpenBMC

References

External links 

GPGPU supercomputers
IBM supercomputers
Lawrence Livermore National Laboratory
NNSA Advanced Technology Systems
Petascale computers